Ascanio Gesualdo (died 27 January 1638) was a Roman Catholic prelate who served as Archbishop of Bari (1613–1638), Titular Patriarch of Constantinople (1618–1638), and Apostolic Nuncio to the Emperor (1617–1621).

Biography
Gesualdo was born in Naples in the later sixteenth century, the son of Michele Gesualdo and Maria Caracciolo. In 1609 he became a referendary of the Apostolic Signatura.

On 1 July 1613, during the papacy of Pope Paul V, he was appointed to the Archdiocese of Bari-Canosa. On 21 October 1615 he was appointed papal nuncio to the Brussels court of the Archdukes Albert and Isabella. On 17 June 1617, he was transferred to Prague as Apostolic Nuncio to the Emperor.

On 25 June 1618, he was appointed by Pope Paul V as Titular Patriarch of Constantinople. On 17 April 1621, he resigned as imperial nuncio. He arrived in Bari on 19 March 1622 and dedicated himself full-time to his duties as Bishop of Bari. He held diocesan synods in 1624 and 1628. He remained Titular Patriarch of Constantinople until his death on 27 January 1638.

He died in Bari, where he was buried in the cathedral.

Episcopal succession

References

External links and additional sources
 (for Chronology of Bishops) 
 (for Chronology of Bishops) 
 (for Chronology of Bishops) 
 (for Chronology of Bishops) 
 (for Chronology of Bishops) 

17th-century Roman Catholic archbishops in the Kingdom of Naples
Bishops appointed by Pope Paul V
1638 deaths
Apostolic Nuncios to the Holy Roman Empire
Apostolic Nuncios to Flanders